Hen and Chicken Bay is a bay on the Parramatta River, in the inner-west of Sydney, in the state of New South Wales, Australia. It lies approximately 8 kilometres due west of Sydney's central business district. It is surrounded by the suburbs of Abbotsford, Drummoyne, Wareemba, Five Dock, Canada Bay, Concord and Cabarita. 

Hen and Chicken Bay is a large bay, and some of its sub-inlets are separately named, including (clockwise from south) Kings Bay, Canada Bay, Exile Bay and France Bay. Canada, Exile and France Bays are all named after internment camps placed here to house convicts from the Lower Canada Rebellion.

In the early days of the colony of New South Wales, it was sometimes known as Stonequarry Cove and Stone Quarry Creek. This may have been because there was once a nearby quarry in Five Dock.

Much of the land around the bay is publicly accessible foreshore or parkland. The bay is a popular location for rowing regattas.

It is also the home of the Hen & Chicken Bay SLSC, which holds occasional patrols on the waterway. It is a voluntary organisation which was formed by a number of locals, including Trevor Folsom, to spread the word of water safety locally & abroad. They have traveled all over the world in the name of good times & have a number of alliance relationships with similar clubs. Funding for a permanent Clubhouse on the Bay are ongoing.

References

Bays of New South Wales